Beth Spotswood Daza (born January 28, 1978 in San Francisco, California), known professionally as Beth Spotswood, is a writer. Among the issues she addresses is gentrification.

Biography
Born in San Francisco, California and raised in Mill Valley, California, Spotswood attended St. Ignatius College Preparatory in San Francisco and Philadelphia University. After graduating in 2000, she returned to San Francisco and began working at Steve Silver's now-defunct Beach Blanket Babylon in 2001.

She was hired by the San Francisco Chronicle in 2007 to write for their culture blog. Spotswood also wrote for the now-defunct San Francisco Appeal and VidSF. As of 2021, she is also the digital editor for Alta Magazine.

Spotswood lives in Novato, California with her husband and son born in 2018.

Her father is former Mill Valley Mayor and current Marin Independent Journal columnist Dick Spotswood.

References

1978 births
Living people
Writers from San Francisco
Thomas Jefferson University alumni